Sasser is a town in Terrell County, Georgia, United States. The population was 393 at the 2000 census. It is part of the Albany, Georgia Metropolitan Statistical Area.

History
A post office called Sasser was established in 1881. The Georgia General Assembly incorporated Sasser as a town in 1890. The community has the name of one William Sasser.

It was founded by G.W. Varner.

Geography

Sasser is located at  (31.720119, -84.347676).

Demographics

As of the census of 2000, there were 393 people, 152 households, and 112 families residing in the town. The racial makeup of the town was 51.65% White, 45.80% African American, 0.76% Native American, 0.25% Asian, 0.51% Pacific Islander, 0.76% from other races, and 0.25% from two or more races. Hispanic or Latino of any race were 1.27% of the population.

There were 152 households, out of which 25.7% had children under the age of 18 living with them, 48.0% were married couples living together, 21.1% had a female householder with no husband present, and 25.7% were non-families. 23.0% of all households were made up of individuals, and 15.1% had someone living alone who was 65 years of age or older. The average household size was 2.59 and the average family size was 3.06.

In the town, the population was spread out, with 23.4% under the age of 18, 7.9% from 18 to 24, 25.2% from 25 to 44, 24.2% from 45 to 64, and 19.3% who were 65 years of age or older. The median age was 41 years. For every 100 females, there were 78.6 males. For every 100 females age 18 and over, there were 78.1 males.

The median income for a household in the town was $28,750, and the median income for a family was $34,773. Males had a median income of $21,607 versus $17,422 for females. The per capita income for the town was $14,658. About 10.6% of families and 17.0% of the population were below the poverty line, including 23.0% of those under age 18 and 21.3% of those age 65 or over.

References

Towns in Terrell County, Georgia
Towns in Georgia (U.S. state)
Albany metropolitan area, Georgia